The Lohrheidestadion is a multi-use stadium in Bochum-Wattenscheid, Germany. It is currently used mostly for football matches and is the home stadium of SG Wattenscheid 09. The stadium is able to hold 16,233 people and opened in 1954.

It is used for athletics by the local club TV Wattenscheid.

References

Football venues in Germany
Athletics (track and field) venues in Germany
Buildings and structures in Bochum
Sports venues in North Rhine-Westphalia
SG Wattenscheid 09